Sam Noto (born April 17, 1930) is an American jazz trumpeter born in Buffalo, New York, perhaps best known for his work with Stan Kenton during the 1950s.

Select discography
 1975 Entrance! (Xanadu)
 1975 Act One (Xanadu)
 1977 Notes to You (Xanadu)
 1978 Noto-Riety (Xanadu)
 1987 2-4-5 (Unisson)
 1999 Now Hear This (Supermono)

With Count Basie
 Pop Goes the Basie (Reprise, 1965)
 The Happiest Millionaire (Coliseum, 1967)
 Half a Sixpence (Dot, 1967)
With Al Cohn and Dexter Gordon
 Silver Blue (1976; Xanadu)
 True Blue (1976; Xanadu)
With Stan Kenton
 Kenton Showcase (Capitol, 1954)
 Contemporary Concepts (Capitol, 1955)
 Kenton in Hi-Fi (Capitol, 1956)
 Cuban Fire! (Capitol, 1956)
 Rendezvous with Kenton (Capitol, 1957)
 Back to Balboa (Capitol, 1958)
With Rob McConnell
 The Jazz Album (1976; Sea Breeze)
 Live in Digital (1980; Sea Breeze)
 Night Flight (1993; Sea Breeze)
With Frank Rosolino
 Frank Rosolino - Kenton Presents Jazz (Capitol; 1954, 1956 LP)
With Red Rodney
Superbop (Muse, 1974)
With Kenny Drew
 For Sure! (1978; Xanadu)

Notes 

American jazz trumpeters
American male trumpeters
Bebop trumpeters
1930 births
Living people
Xanadu Records artists
21st-century trumpeters
21st-century American male musicians
American male jazz musicians
Musicians from Buffalo, New York